Scott C. Fergus is a former Democratic member of the Wisconsin State Assembly.

Biography
Fergus was born on January 27, 1955, in Racine, Wisconsin. He graduated from Washington Park High School and Carthage College.

Career
Fergus was first elected to the Assembly in 1984 and was re-elected in 1986 and 1988.  In 1989, Fergus was one of about a dozen Wisconsin legislators caught up in a "John Doe" investigation of improper gifts from lobbyists.  Fergus ultimately paid about $2,000 in fines.

In May, 1990, Fergus announced he would not seek re-election and would instead take a job as Vice President of the Wisconsin Realtors Association.

A few years later he founded the Nexus Builders Group, a construction company, and moved into residential and commercial property development as President of the KeyBridge Development Group.  In 2008, Fergus went bankrupt pursuing two major residential development projects, Pointe Blue, on the Racine harbor, and First Place, a condo development in Milwaukee.

Electoral history

| colspan="6" style="text-align:center;background-color: #e9e9e9;"| Primary Election

| colspan="6" style="text-align:center;background-color: #e9e9e9;"| General Election

| colspan="6" style="text-align:center;background-color: #e9e9e9;"| Primary Election

| colspan="6" style="text-align:center;background-color: #e9e9e9;"| General Election

| colspan="6" style="text-align:center;background-color: #e9e9e9;"| Primary Election

| colspan="6" style="text-align:center;background-color: #e9e9e9;"| General Election

References

Politicians from Racine, Wisconsin
Carthage College alumni
1955 births
Living people
Democratic Party members of the Wisconsin State Assembly